Robert Darren Brooks (born June 23, 1970) is a former American football wide receiver who attended University of South Carolina and played for the Green Bay Packers (1992–1998) and the Denver Broncos.

Biography

Early life
Brooks started playing football in a pee wee league at the age of six. He then moved on to playing at Northside Junior High. He played running back until he reached college. In his senior year at Greenwood high school, he scored 14 touchdowns and gained over 700 yards. He was also a state champion track star in high school. He was considered one of the best track athletes in the world after winning the 110 meter high hurdles with a time of 13.9 seconds at the Keebler International Prep Track and Field Invitational in June 1988.

College career
Brooks played collegiately for the University of South Carolina (1988–1991).  He was a fan favorite throughout his college career, Brooks was known for his fluid running and sure hands.  He was a Freshman All-American in 1988.
Originally recruited as a running back, Brooks took to the field at wide receiver wearing the jersey number 49 for the Gamecocks. During the 1988 season, Brooks, then a freshman, made an exceptional over-the-shoulder one handed catch for a touchdown against the Georgia Bulldogs.

Professional career
Brooks was drafted in the third round, 62nd overall, of the 1992 NFL draft to the Green Bay Packers. He played for the Green Bay Packers (1992–1998) and the Denver Broncos (2000). He led the NFL in kickoff returns in 1993 with a 26.6-yard average. He came into his own in 1995, following a career-ending injury to teammate Sterling Sharpe. That year, he led the Packers with 102 receptions and 13 touchdowns, while racking up 1,497 receiving yards, a franchise record that stood until broken by Jordy Nelson in 2014. During the 1995 season, Brooks caught a 99-yard pass play from Brett Favre during a Monday Night Football game against the Chicago Bears September 11, 1995. This reception currently ties the records for longest pass play from scrimmage with twelve other receivers.

Brooks suffered a severe knee injury in week 7 of the 1996 season against the San Francisco 49ers, when Niners cornerback Tyronne Drakeford fought off a block and pulled him down tearing his anterior cruciate ligament and patellar tendon on the play. He missed the remainder of the season, and was unable to play in Super Bowl XXXI. The Packers beat the New England Patriots 35-21. Brooks vowed to return the next season, and in 1997 he won the NFL Comeback Player of the Year award, catching 60 passes for 1,010 yards and 7 touchdowns.

Brooks later developed back problems as he was forced to change his running mechanics. He suffered through a painful season in 1998, and briefly retired before attempting a comeback with the Broncos in 2000. He appeared in only a handful of games in Denver, before again retiring from the NFL. He finished his career with 309 receptions, 4,276 yards, and 32 touchdowns.

Brooks popularized the Lambeau Leap touchdown celebration.

's NFL off-season, Robert Brooks held at least 3 Packers franchise records, including:
 Most Punt Ret Yds (playoff career): 214
 Most 100+ yard receiving games (season): 11 (1995, two in postseason)
 Most 100+ yard receiving games (playoffs): 3 (tied with Antonio Freeman and Greg Jennings)

Post-football career
After his professional football career ended, members of Brooks family called him about going into the music industry, using the nickname “Shoo-in” which he had developed during his football-playing days.  Brooks created the record label “Shoo-in 4 Life”. He also has produced two CD's entitled Jump and Down wit’ tha Bay.
He is the wide receivers coach at Brophy College Preparatory, a high school in Phoenix Arizona. 
Brooks is now married and the father of three children — Robert, Elisha and Austin — residing in the Phoenix, AZ area. He has become the minister of Trendsetters Church at RBM Center in Phoenix.

References

External links
Brooks' stats
Robert Brooks' homepage 

1970 births
Living people
American football wide receivers
Green Bay Packers players
Denver Broncos players
South Carolina Gamecocks football players
People from Greenwood, South Carolina
Players of American football from South Carolina
Ed Block Courage Award recipients